The , also known as Izu–Bonin Trench, is an oceanic trench in the western Pacific Ocean, consisting of the Izu Trench (at the north) and the Bonin Trench (at the south, west of the Ogasawara Plateau).

It stretches from Japan to the northernmost section of Mariana Trench. The Izu–Ogasawara Trench is an extension of the Japan Trench. Here, the Pacific Plate is being subducted beneath the Philippine Sea Plate, creating the Izu Islands and Bonin Islands on the Izu–Bonin–Mariana Arc system.

The xenophyophore Occultammina was first discovered at a depth of 8260 metres in the trench.

See also
 Oceanic trench
 Izu–Bonin–Mariana Arc

References

Oceanic trenches of the Pacific Ocean
Geology of Japan
Landforms of Japan
Subduction zones
Izu Islands
Natural history of the Bonin Islands